The state of Iowa played a significant role during the American Civil War in providing food, supplies, troops and officers for the Union army.

Prelude to war

Iowa had become the 29th state in the Union on December 28, 1846, and the state continued to attract many settlers, both native and foreign-born. Only the extreme northwestern part of the state remained a frontier area. With the development in the 1850s of the Illinois Central and the Chicago and North Western Railway, Iowa's fertile fields were linked with Eastern supply depots as the Civil War began. Manufacturing companies in the eastern part of the state, as well as farmers, could readily get their products to the Union army.

Civil War

Politics

The Civil War era brought considerable change to Iowa's politics.  During the 1850s, the state's dominant Democratic Party developed serious internal problems, as well as being unsuccessful in getting the national Democratic Party to respond to their local needs. Iowans soon turned to the newly emerging Republican Party. The new party opposed slavery and promoted land ownership, banking, and railroads, and Iowa voted heavily for Abraham Lincoln and other Republican politicians in 1860 and throughout the war, though there was a strong antiwar "Copperhead" movement among recent settlers of Southern origins. The Democratic party remained particularly in places around the Mississippi River such as Dubuque that had been heavily settled by German immigrants.

Military recruitment

As the Civil War erupted, Governor Samuel J. Kirkwood led efforts to raise and equip volunteer troops for the Federal service. The 1st Iowa Infantry was raised for three-months duty from May until August 1861. It helped secure the strategic Hannibal and St. Joseph Railroad in northern Missouri, then endured a series of forced marches across the state, finally fighting with distinction in the Battle of Wilson's Creek, a task rewarded by the official Thanks of Congress, and two Iowans would later be awarded the Medal of Honor for their efforts in the fighting.

There were no significant battles in Iowa, but the state sent large supplies of food to the armies and the eastern cities. 76,242 Iowa men (out of a total population of 674,913 in 1860) served in the military, many in combat units attached to the western armies. 13,001 died of wounds or disease (two-thirds of whom were of the latter). 8,500 Iowa men were wounded. Cemeteries throughout the South contain the remains of Iowa soldiers who fell during the war, with the largest concentration at Vicksburg National Cemetery. A number also died in Confederate prison camps, including Andersonville prison.  Though the total number of Iowans who served in the military during the Civil War seems small compared to the more heavily populated eastern and southern states, no other state, north or south, had a higher percentage of its male population between the ages of 15 and 40 serve in the military during the course of the war.

Iowa contributed 48 regiments of state infantry, 1 regiment of black infantry (the 1st Iowa Volunteer Infantry Regiment (African Descent)), 9 regiments of cavalry, and 4 artillery batteries. In addition to these Federally mustered troops, the state also raised a number of home guard or militia units, including the Northern Border Brigade and Southern Border Brigade, primarily for defense of the borders, but with a commission from governor Kirkwood authorizing the border brigades to cross into Missouri (or into Minnesota and Dakota Territory) to pursue Confederate or Indian raiders as the case may be. Both the Ho Chunk (Winnebagos) and the Santee band of the Sioux nation posed the biggest threat to Iowa's northwestern border. Other local units included the Sioux City Cavalry—a militia company which, however, was subsequently mustered into US service and deployed to Dakota Territory after the Santee Sioux Uprising of 1862 and became General Alfred Sully's Headquarters Guard during the Union Army's subsequent "Punitive Expeditions" against 700 renegade Santee Sioux in 1863 and 1864. Sully selected the Sioux City Cavalry as his escort and guard over several other cavalry units because of the previous experience of its members who had worked for years before the war as trappers, traders and teamsters along the Military Road running from the US Army logistics depot at Sioux City northwest to the Dakota Territorial capital at Yankton and onward to Fort Randall which, at that time, was the largest US Army post on the upper Missouri river. As such these militia troopers were thoroughly experienced with other Sioux bands—such as the Yankton and Yankonais—and knew their sign, their language, and their customs. Likewise, the 6th Iowa Cavalry and one battalion of the 14th Iowa Infantry were deployed to Forts Randall, Pierre and Berthold, Dakota Territory as part of the same campaigns against the Santee renegades.

Sporadically, Confederate partisans and bushwhackers  raided Iowa. One such incursion in the fall of 1864 was designed to disrupt the reelection of Abraham Lincoln. Near the Missouri border, many Iowans were pro-slavery, anti-Lincoln Confederate sympathizers, and they provided a safe haven for guerrillas. On October 12, 1864, a dozen raiders disguised as Union soldiers terrorized Davis County, where they looted residences and kidnapped and murdered three Iowans near Bloomfield.

Postbellum memorialization

The Keokuk National Cemetery was established as a final resting place for bodies from five local U.S. Army hospitals in Keokuk. It holds over 600 Union soldiers, and 8 Confederate prisoners of war.

Following the war, a number of veterans organizations, and in particular the Grand Army of the Republic, played a prominent role in providing social functions, financial support, and memorialization of the former soldiers. The G.A.R. provided the funds and impetus for the construction of the Iowa Soldiers' Home in Marshalltown and other similar homes and hospitals, as well as orphanages.

See also
 List of Iowa Civil War Units
 Camp McClellan (Iowa)
 Dubuque, Iowa, in the Civil War

Further reading
 Anderson, J. L. "The Vacant Chair on the Farm: Soldier Husbands, Farm Wives, and the Iowa Home Front, 1861–1865," Annals of Iowa (2007) 66: 241–265
 Baker, Thomas R. Sacred Cause of Union: Iowa in the Civil War (2016)
 Bergman, Marvin, ed. Iowa History Reader (1996) essays by scholars.
 Clark, Olynthus B. The Politics of Iowa during the Civil War and Reconstruction (1911)
 Hofsommer, Don L. Steel Trails Of Hawkeyeland: Iowa's Railroad Experience (2005)
 Johnson, Russell L. Warriors into Workers: The Civil War and the Formation of the Urban-Industrial Society in a Northern City (2003) About Dubuque
 Lyftogt, Kenneth L. Iowa and the Civil War. Vol. 1: Free Child of the Missouri Compromise, 1850–1862. Iowa City, IA: Camp Pope Publishing, 2018.  online review.
 Sage, Leland. A History of Iowa (1974) online
 Soike, Lowell J. Busy in the Cause: Iowa, the Free-state Struggle in the West, and the Prelude to the Civil War (U of Nebraska Press, 2014).

External links
 Iowa soldiers' Civil War Diaries and Letters
 Iowa in the Civil War Project
 Civil War letters of Iowans
 The 22nd Iowa Infantry Homepage
 U.S. Army bibliography for Iowa in the Civil War
 Iowa Battleflag Preservation
 History of the 1st Iowa Infantry

 
American Civil War by state